The Secret Diary of Desmond Pfeiffer is an American sitcom  that aired on UPN from October 5 to October 26, 1998. Before it even debuted, the series set off a storm of controversy because of a perceived light-hearted take on the issue of American slavery.

Story
A Black English nobleman named Desmond Pfeiffer, chased out of the United Kingdom due to gambling debts, becomes President Abraham Lincoln's valet. In the show, he serves as the intelligent and erudite backbone of a Civil War-era White House populated by louts and drunkards.

Cast
 Chi McBride as Desmond Pfeiffer, Black English gentleman serving as President Lincoln's butler
 Dann Florek as Abraham Lincoln, 16th President of the United States
 Christine Estabrook as Mary Todd Lincoln, President Lincoln's wife
 Max Baker as Nibblet, Pfeiffer's assistant
 Kelly Connell as Ulysses S. Grant, general of the United States Army

Controversy
Before the series' premiere, several African-American activist groups, including the Los Angeles Chapter of the NAACP, protested against the premise of the series. On September 24, 1998, a protest against the series was held outside Paramount Studios. Five days later, UPN released a statement regarding the controversy and stated that the network planned on delaying the controversial pilot episode (which never aired) and would instead air an alternate episode in its place.

Ratings
The first episode of the series aired on October 5, 1998, ranking 116th out of 125 television programs for that week. Desmond Pfeiffer was removed from UPN's schedule on October 24, and after airing one episode two days after being removed from UPN's lineup, was cancelled, thus hastening the demise of UPN president Dean Valentine.

Reception
David Hofstede rated the show one of the "100 Dumbest Events in Television History", but pointed out that despite the protests, the show did not portray slaves and did not employ racial humor. Instead, it was intended as a critique of Bill Clinton and the Monica Lewinsky scandal, with the sexual world of the Oval Office played for laughs. Hofstede considered the sexual humor juvenile, but found the racially sensitive backlash even "dumber".

It was ranked #5 on Entertainment Weekly's Top 50 TV Bombs.

In popular culture 
The series was alluded to multiple times in the unaired pilot episode of Clerks: The Animated Series, "Leonardo Leonardo Returns and Dante Has an Important Decision to Make", which featured Dante and Randal drawing inspiration from a nonexistent episode of The Secret Diary of Desmond Pfeiffer, which Randal describes as "classic Pfeiffer". In the also-unaired third episode, "Leonardo Is Caught in the Grip of an Outbreak of Randal's Imagination and Patrick Swayze Either Does or Doesn't Work in the New Pet Store", Dante and Randal are seen at the drive-thru for Desmond Pfeiffer's Civil War Burgers, a fictional fast-food restaurant.

Episodes

See also
Abraham Lincoln cultural depictions
1998 in television
List of sitcoms known for negative reception

References

External links
 
 

1998 American television series debuts
1998 American television series endings
1990s American black sitcoms
1990s American sitcoms
Fictional depictions of Abraham Lincoln in television
English-language television shows
Television series about the American Civil War
Television series by CBS Studios
Television shows set in Washington, D.C.
UPN original programming
Cultural depictions of Abraham Lincoln
Television series set in the 19th century
White House in fiction
Television controversies in the United States
African-American-related controversies